Temple Beth Shmuel or Cuban Hebrew Congregation of Miami is a synagogue used by Ashkenazi Jewish Cuban expatriates in Miami Beach, Florida. "Approximately 94 percent of Cuba’s Jewish population fled after the [1959] Revolution." The synagogue was founded in 1961 by Felix Reyler, Oscar White, and Bernardo Benes. Its current location at 1700 North Michigan Avenue opened in 1975, with an expansion in 1982. The congregation is led by Rabbi Stephen Texon and Baal Koreh Jacques Malka. It currently hosts 170 member households and has a Montessori School.

The temple was designed by Oscar Sklar. It includes stained glass windows of the Twelve Tribes of Israel designed by Inge Pape Trampler. Mexican artist Naomi Siegman designed the candelabras beside the bimah. The synagogue is named for Shmuel Schacter, father of Jack Chester.

References

External links

Synagogues in Miami Beach, Florida
Conservative synagogues in Florida
Ashkenazi synagogues
American people of Cuban-Jewish descent
Ashkenazi Jewish culture in Florida
Cuban-American culture in Florida
Hispanic and Latino-Jewish culture in the United States
Jewish organizations established in 1961
1961 establishments in Florida
Synagogues completed in 1975
1975 establishments in Florida
Synagogues completed in 1982